The 2009 Asian Airgun Championships were held in Doha, Qatar between December 16 and December 22, 2009. It acts as the Asian qualifying tournament for the 2010 Summer Youth Olympics in Singapore.

Medal summary

Men

Women

Medal table

References 
General
 ISSF Results Overview
 Results

Specific

External links 
 Official site

Asian Shooting Championships
Asian
Shooting
2009 in Qatari sport
21st century in Doha
Sports competitions in Doha
Shooting competitions in Qatar